Duhabi may refer to:

Duhabi, Janakpur, Village Development Committee in the Janakpur Zone of south-eastern Nepal
Duhabi, Kosi, Village Development Committee in the Kosi Zone of south-eastern Nepal